Oscar Hoppe (June 11, 1886 – January 19, 1936) was a figure skater who competed in men's singles and pair skating. First he represented the German Empire, then Czechoslovakia. He was born in Troppau in what was then the duchy of Austrian Silesia in the Austro-Hungarian Empire, and died in the same city (known in Czech as Opava), which by then was in Czechoslovakia.

With his wife Else Hoppe, he won the bronze medal at the 1927 World Figure Skating Championships in Vienna.

Competitive highlights

Pairs 
With  Else Hoppe

References 

1886 births
1936 deaths
German male single skaters
German male pair skaters
Czechoslovak male pair skaters